Stone Flower is a monument to the victims of the Ustasha genocide of the Serbs during the World War II in Yugoslavia, located in Jasenovac, Croatia. Designed by Bogdan Bogdanović and unveiled in 1966, it serves as a reminder of the atrocities perpetrated in the Jasenovac concentration camp.

External links

Official Site of the Jasenovac Memorial – includes history and profile of architect
Official Site of the Jasenovac Memorial – Gallery
Spomenik Database - Jasenovac

Buildings and structures completed in 1966
World War II memorials in Croatia
Buildings and structures in Sisak-Moslavina County
Yugoslav World War II monuments and memorials
Tourist attractions in Sisak-Moslavina County
Concrete sculptures